Apostolepis multicincta, Harvey's  blackhead, is a species of snake in the family Colubridae. It is endemic to Bolivia.

References 

multicincta
Reptiles described in 1999
Reptiles of Bolivia
Taxa named by Michael B. Harvey